One Track Heart: The Story of Krishna Das is a 2012 documentary film directed by Jeremy  about Krishna Das, the U.S. vocalist best known for his performances on Hindu devotional music called kirtan. One Track Heart premiered at the Maui Film Festival on June 17, 2012 and is distributed by Zeitgeist Films. It opened theatrically in the United States in the spring of 2013.

Plot
Jeremy 's 2012 film One Track Heart: The Story of Krishna Das documents the life and musical career of American kirtan singer Krishna Das. In 1970, while struggling with drug abuse and depression, Das left his native Long Island, New York for India, selling all his possessions and turning down the opportunity to record as lead vocalist with the band that would later become Blue Öyster Cult. While in India he formed a close relationship with the guru Neem Karoli Baba (Maharaj-ji), setting him on a new spiritual course and eventually leading to his emergence as Krishna Das – the world-renowned spiritual teacher, chant master, and Grammy-nominated musician. The film features interviews with Be Here Now author and spiritual guru Ram Das, Grammy-winning producer Rick Rubin (The Beastie Boys, Metallica, Jay-Z), New York Times bestselling author Sharon Salzberg, and two-time Pulitzer Prize nominee Daniel Goleman, as well as a score by Dinosaur Jr's J Mascis and Devadas.

Cast
 Krishna Das, Rick Rubin, Daniel Goleman, Sharon Salzberg, Dr. Larry Brilliant, Jason Becker, Jai Uttal, Wah!, Lama Surya Das, David Nichtern, Sharon Gannon and David Life

Awards
 2012: Maui Film Festival Best Documentary Film
 2012: Gold Coast International Film Festival Best Documentary Film
 2012: Woodstock Film Festival Official Selection
 2013: Santa Barbara International Film Festival Official Selection

References

External links
 
 
 

2010s English-language films